The sixth season of the stop-motion television series Robot Chicken originally aired in the United States on Cartoon Network's late night programming block, Adult Swim. Season six officially began on September 10, 2012, on Adult Swim, with Robot Chicken DC Comics Special and contained a total of twenty episodes. The first of the regular Season 6 episodes aired on September 17, 2012. This is also the first season to be streamed uncensored on HBO Max since the first 5 seasons are censored.

Overview 
The sixth season of Robot Chicken includes many TV, movie, commercial, pop culture parodies, all acted out by dolls and action figures.

Robot Chicken DC Comics Special (September 10, 2012) is a DC Universe special, in collaboration with DC Entertainment and Warner Bros. Animation. Voice actors are Seth Green as Batman, Robin and Aquaman, Paul Reubens as the Riddler, Neil Patrick Harris as Two-Face, Alfred Molina as Lex Luthor, Nathan Fillion as the Green Lantern, Megan Fox as Lois Lane, Breckin Meyer as Superman, and Kevin Shinick as the narrator. Cast also includes Abraham Benrubi, Alex Borstein, Clare Grant, Tara Strong, Matthew Senreich, Aaron Paul, Steven Tyler, Tom Root and Zeb Wells.

Guest stars 
Many celebrities have guest starred in Robot Chicken season 6; they include Whoopi Goldberg, Elizabeth Banks, Sam Elliott, Jason Sudeikis, Krysten Ritter, Fred Tatasciore, Jon Stewart, Stanley Tucci, Daniel Radcliffe, Patrick Stewart, Dan Milano, Victor Yerrid, Bill Farmer, Zeb Wells, Alex Borstein, Alan Tudyk, Christina Laskay, Tom Hiddleston, Ellie Kemper, Mark Hamill, Tamara Garfield, Liz Loza, Breckin Meyer, John Moschitta Jr., Britne Oldford, Rachel Bloom, Sarah Ramos, Dreama Walker, Rachael MacFarlane, Allison Janney, Kat Dennings, Liev Schreiber, Alex Winter, Shawn Patterson, Olivia Wilde, William Zabka, Ralph Macchio, Rhea Perlman, Ashley Eckstein, Lacey Chabert, Gillian Jacobs, Brent Spiner, Zachary Levi, J.B. Smoove, Lake Bell, Jon Bernthal, Nicholas Hoult, Robert Kirkman, Megan Hilty, Maurice LaMarche, Lucas Grabeel, Ke$ha, Sarah Chalke, Billy Zane, Sarah Michelle Gellar, Jim Hanks, Keith Ferguson, Patrick Pinney, Cat Taber, Linda Cardellini, Rachael Leigh Cook, George Lowe, David Hasselhoff, David Morse, Skeet Ulrich, Stan Lee, Melissa Joan Hart, Emily Head, Max Charles, Frank Welker, Freddie Prinze Jr., Seth MacFarlane, Lauren Ambrose, Delroy Lindo, Ben Schwartz, Kathryn Hahn, Clare Grant, Abraham Benrubi, Eden Espinosa, Madison Dylan, Michaela Watkins, Henry Winkler, Laura Ortiz, Ashley Chaney, Keith David, Quinton Flynn, Joss Whedon, Malin Åkerman, Eric McCormack, 50 Cent, Judy Greer and Matthew Lillard.

Episodes

Notes

References 

2012 American television seasons
2013 American television seasons
Robot Chicken seasons